Gerald Lehner may refer to:

 Gerald Lehner (referee) (1968–2016), Austrian football referee
 Gerald Lehner (journalist) (born 1963), Austrian journalist and author